Snarling at Strangers is a repackaged version of Smiling at Strangers, an Australian Hip Hop album by TZU. The album also came with an EP containing five previously unreleased tracks. These tracks (listed under the 2nd disc title 'Snarl') were not included on the original album, as the band considered them too political , while the Smiling At Strangers album was quite upbeat.

Track listing

Disc 1, 'Smile'

 "Hey OK" - 3:23
 "She Gets Up" - 4:00
 "Logical" - 2:50
 "Recoil" - 5:00
 "Tzu Blues (Sweet Little Hoochie)" - 4:31
 "Won't Get Played" - 3:52
 "Coming Round" - 6:16
 "In Front Of Me" - 3:38
 "Back To Front" - 3:09
 "Reminisce" - 4:52
 "Lounge" - 4:09
 "Raise 'Em Up" - 3:13
 "Unnecessarily Blue" - 5:21
 "Unnecessarily Blue (Remix)" - 7:55

Disc 2, 'Snarl'

 "Pacman" - 3:42
 "City" - 3:09
 "Gone" - 3:28
 "On A Train" - 4:33
 "Listen" - 4:39

TZU albums
2006 albums